"Killer on the Loose" is a song by Irish rock band Thin Lizzy, released as a single in September 1980. It was written by Phil Lynott, and is from their 1980 album Chinatown. The song was a chart hit, peaking at No. 10 on the UK Singles Chart, and No. 5 on the Irish Singles Chart.

Controversy
The song, in which Lynott took the persona of Jack the Ripper, received much controversy. The single was released amidst the Yorkshire Ripper murders and many members of the British public, largely women, were outraged by the song's lyrics and its references to the Ripper. A music video, in which Lynott is dressed in a Ripper style trench coat surrounded by scantily clad women, generated even more controversy when it was released in 1980.

Personnel 
Phil Lynott – bass guitar, vocals
Scott Gorham – lead guitar
Snowy White – lead guitar
Darren Wharton – keyboards
Brian Downey – drums

References

1980 songs
1980 singles
Thin Lizzy songs
Songs written by Phil Lynott
Vertigo Records singles